Douglas Trainer was President of the National Union of Students of the United Kingdom (NUS) from 1996 to 1998, having served the previous two years as President of NUS Scotland, winning both as the Labour Students candidate.

He went on to work for, and become a partner in public relations company Luther Pendragon, and in 2006 became a special adviser for the Scottish Executive.

Since Labour's defeat in the Scottish Parliament election, 2007, Trainer has worked for Serco as Communications Director for their Civil Government Business and is now working for Newham Council.  He recently separated from government headhunter Andrea Bainger.

References

Living people
Year of birth missing (living people)
Alumni of the University of Strathclyde
Presidents of the National Union of Students (United Kingdom)